Seven Cent Cotton and Forty Cent Meat is an American song of the Great Depression, which was published in 1930 by Bob Miller and Emma Dermer. The song details the experiences of a cotton farmer during the Great Depression when the price of cotton fell so low that cotton farming could no longer provide basic necessities.

Covers
Two time Grammy-winning Americana/country/bluegrass singer artist Jim Lauderdale provided a version of this song for Janet Reno's compilation of traditional American songs entitled Song of America.

American folk singer Pete Seeger recorded a cover of this song, which was released on his 1956 album American Industrial Ballads.

References

External links
Lyrics

American folk songs
Great Depression songs